Algarra is a municipality in Cuenca, Castile-La Mancha, Spain. It had a population of 24 as of 2020.

References 

Municipalities in the Province of Cuenca